Thomas Andrew Osborn (October 26, 1836 – February 4, 1898) was the sixth governor of Kansas.

Osborn was born in Meadville, Pennsylvania. As a young man, he was apprenticed as a printer, from which he supported himself through Allegheny College. In 1856, he began to study law under a Meadville judge and was admitted to the Michigan bar in 1857. He married Julia Delahey and they had one child.

In November 1857, Osborn moved to Lawrence, Kansas, where he became a compositor for the Herald of Freedom. The following year, Osborn was practicing law in Elwood, Kansas, and was known to be a Republican and Free-State supporter. He was elected to the state senate in December 1859. He became president of the senate in 1861 and presided over impeachment proceedings of the governor. Osborn was appointed U. S. Marshall and held that post from 1865 to 1867. Elected in 1872, and re-elected in 1874, he was governor of Kansas from 1873 to 1877. Osborn was Minister to Chile from 1877 to 1881 and Minister to Brazil from 1881 to 1885,

Osborn's wife died in 1892. In 1898, he was engaged to Marguerite Fowler Richmond of Meadville, Pennsylvania. While awaiting their wedding, Osborn died and his body was returned to Kansas. He is buried in Topeka Cemetery in Topeka, Kansas.

References

External links
 
 Publications concerning Kansas Governor Osborn's administration available via the KGI Online Library.

 

1836 births
1898 deaths
People from Doniphan County, Kansas
People from Lawrence, Kansas
People from Meadville, Pennsylvania
Republican Party governors of Kansas
Lieutenant Governors of Kansas
19th-century American diplomats
Ambassadors of the United States to Chile
Ambassadors of the United States to Brazil
Methodists from Kansas
19th-century American politicians
People buried in Topeka Cemetery
Methodists from Pennsylvania
Kansas lawyers
Michigan lawyers